This is a round-up of the 2001 Sligo Senior Football Championship. St. Mary's returned to claim their tenth title, defeating Curry by three points in the final. Holders Bunninadden exited in the group stages, with the 2000 finalists Coolera/Strandhill eliminating them from the Championship.

Group stages

The Championship was contested by 12 teams, divided into four groups. The top two sides in each group advanced to the quarter-finals.

Group A

Group B

Group C

Group D

Quarterfinals

Semi-finals

Last eight

Sligo Senior Football Championship Final

References

 Sligo Champion (July–October 2001)
 Sligo Weekender (July–October 2001)

Sligo Senior Football Championship
Sligo